Marsh hen may refer to:

 Marsh Hen, an American sailboat design
 Marsh Hen Mill, an American company
 Moorhen, sometimes called a marsh hen, a species of bird

See also

 Marshbird
 
 Marsh (disambiguation)
 Hen (disambiguation)